Nothing but the Best is a 2008 compilation album by American singer Frank Sinatra. All the tracks on this album are recordings made when Sinatra was on his own Reprise label, thus the first track, "Come Fly with Me" is not the 1957 Capitol version. Other notable differences are "Strangers in the Night" has an extended fade out and the first cymbal hit is cut from the beginning of the "Theme from New York, New York".

The album was certified Gold by the RIAA on December 9, 2008. It has been present on the Billboard Top 200 for 135 weeks as of August 16, 2012 
The producer of this album is Charles Pignone and the executive producer is Robert Finkelstein & Jimmy Edwards.

This album is presented in 3 versions: standard edition (22 tracks),
Christmas edition (22 tracks + 12 Christmas songs) and a DVD edition (22 tracks + 1 DVD concert of the artist, in addition this album is packaged in Digipack format).

Track listings 
"Come Fly with Me" (Sammy Cahn, Jimmy Van Heusen) - 3:14
"The Best is Yet to Come" (Cy Coleman, Carolyn Leigh) - 2:56
"The Way You Look Tonight" (Jerome Kern, Dorothy Fields) - 3:22
"Luck Be a Lady" (Frank Loesser) - 5:15
"Bewitched, Bothered and Bewildered" (Richard Rodgers, Lorenz Hart) - 3:00
"The Good Life" (Sacha Distel, Jack Reardon) - 2:27
"The Girl from Ipanema" (Antonio Carlos Jobim, Norman Gimbel, Vinícius de Moraes) - 3:14
"Fly Me to the Moon (In Other Words)" (Bart Howard) - 2:28
"Summer Wind" (Heinz Meier, Hans Bradtke, Johnny Mercer) - 2:55
"Strangers in the Night" (Bert Kaempfert, Charles Singleton, Eddie Snyder) - 2:45
"Call Me Irresponsible" (Cahn, Van Heusen) - 2:56
"Somethin' Stupid" [With Nancy Sinatra] (Carson Parks) - 2:40
"My Kind of Town" (Cahn, Van Heusen) - 3:11
"It Was a Very Good Year" (Ervin Drake) - 4:27
"That's Life" (Kelly Gordon, Dean Kay) - 3:07
"Moonlight Serenade" (Glenn Miller, Mitchell Parish) - 3:28
"Nothing But the Best" (Johnny Rotella) - 3:00
"Drinking Again" (Johnny Mercer, Doris Tauber) - 3:15
"All My Tomorrows" (Cahn, Van Heusen) - 4:35
"My Way" (Paul Anka, Claude François, Jacques Revaux, Gilles Thibault) - 4:36
"Theme from New York, New York" (Fred Ebb, John Kander) - 3:25
"Body and Soul" [Previously unissued] (Frank Eyton, Johnny Green, Edward Heyman, Robert Sour) - 4:20
"The Coffee Song" - 2:51 [Hidden Track] (Bob Hilliard, Dick Miles)

Christmas Edition
This is a limited re-edition of the original 1964 album 12 Songs of Christmas, by Bing Crosby, Frank Sinatra and Fred Waring and The Pennsylvanians.

DVD edition 
 "Introduction by Princess Grace of Monaco"
 "You Make Me Feel So Young"
 "Pennies from Heaven"
 "I've Got You Under My Skin"
 "Something"
 "The Lady Is a Tramp"
 "I Get Along Without You Very Well"
 "Didn't We"
 "One for My Baby"
 "I Will Drink the Wine"
 "I Have Dreamed"
 "My Kind of Town"
 "My Way"

Charts

Weekly charts

Year-end charts

Certifications

References 

2008 compilation albums
2008 live albums
2008 video albums
Live video albums
Frank Sinatra compilation albums
Frank Sinatra live albums
Warner Records compilation albums
Warner Records live albums
Frank Sinatra video albums
Compilation albums published posthumously